The Shelby Family Houses near Lexington, Kentucky are five houses that together were listed on the National Register of Historic Places in 1978.

The listing covers:
"Greenfields", 5510 Richmond Road, Lexington
"Grassland" (1823), Shelby Lane, Lexington, an L-shaped two-and-a-half-story brick house
"Richland" (1820s or 1830s), Richmond Road, Lexington
"Ruemont", Jacks Creek Pike, Lexington
"Highland Hall", 6208 Richmond Rd., Lexington, Kentucky, which is separately listed on the National Register.

A sixth house, "Belair", is excluded from the National Register listing.

The  listing included, in 1978, 10 contributing buildings and one other contributing site.

References

National Register of Historic Places in Lexington, Kentucky
Houses on the National Register of Historic Places in Kentucky
Houses in Lexington, Kentucky
Historic districts on the National Register of Historic Places in Kentucky